Coleia is an extinct genus of decapods in the group Polychelida that lived from the Late Triassic to the Late Jurassic. It was described by Broderip in 1835, and the type species is C. antiqua. A new species, C. martinlutheri, which existed during the Sinemurian of what is now Germany, was described by Günter Schweigert and Werner Ernst in 2012.

Species

Coleia antiqua Broderip, 1835
Coleia barrovensis McCoy, 1849
Coleia boboi Garassino & Gironi, 2006
Coleia bredonensis Woods, 1925
Coleia brodiei Woodward, 1866
Coleia crassichelis Woodward, 1866
Coleia edwardsi Moriere, 1864
Coleia gigantea (Van Straelen, 1923) 
Coleia incerta Secretan, 1964
Coleia longipes Fraas, 1855
Coleia martinlutheri Schweigert & Ernst, 2012
Coleia mediterranea Pinna, 1968
Coleia moorei Woodward, 1866
Coleia morierei Renault, 1889
Coleia pinnai Teruzzi, 1990
Coleia popeyei Teruzzi, 1990
Coleia sibirica Chernyschev, 1930
Coleia sinuata Beurlen, 1928
Coleia tenuichelis Woods, 1925
Coleia theodorii Kuhn, 1952
Coleia uzume Karasawa, 2003
Coleia viallii Pinna, 1968
Coleia wilmcotensis Woodward, 1866

References

External links
 Coleia at the Paleobiology Database

Polychelida
Triassic crustaceans
Jurassic crustaceans
Fossils of Germany
Late Triassic first appearances
Late Jurassic extinctions